Bernt Bjørnsgaard (born 1973) is a Norwegian orienteering competitor and World champion. He won a gold medal in the 1999 World Orienteering Championships in Inverness with the Norwegian Relay team. He received a silver medal in the 2001 World Orienteering Championships in Tampere.

He represented Halden SK.

References

External links
 
 

1973 births
Living people
Norwegian orienteers
Male orienteers
Foot orienteers
World Orienteering Championships medalists
20th-century Norwegian people
Junior World Orienteering Championships medalists